Wilson Joseph (born 22 November 1984), professionally credited as Siju Wilson, is an Indian actor and producer, who works in Malayalam films. He won the Kerala State Film Award for Best Film for his debut production Vasanthi (2019).

Career
He completed BSc Nursing.
Siju attained recognition through his role as Roy Issac (Royichan) in the show Just fun Chumma telecast on Amrita TV. Later, he appeared in films, of which notable of them are Neram (2013), Premam (2015), Happy Wedding (2016), Kattappanayile Rithwik Roshan (2016), Njandukalude Nattil Oridavela (2017), and Aadhi (2018). Wilson produced and acted the film Vasanthi, that won the 2019 Kerala State Film Award for Best Film.

Personal life
Siju Wilson tied the knot with his longtime girlfriend Sruthi on 28 May 2017 at Kochi.

Filmography

All films are in Malayalam language unless otherwise noted.

Television

Short films

Awards
2019: Kerala State Film Award for Best Film – Vasanthi

References

External links
Articles.timesofindia.indiatimes.com

1984 births
Living people
Male actors from Kochi
Indian male film actors
People from Aluva
Male actors in Malayalam cinema
Male actors in Malayalam television
21st-century Indian male actors